Tom Brown's Schooldays is a 1971 television serial adaptation of the 1857 Thomas Hughes novel Tom Brown's Schooldays.

It was originally screened on the BBC1 Sunday afternoon slot, which often showed serialisations of classics aimed at a family audience.  It made some free adaptations to Hughes's novel, creating the role of Flashman's father, and added new sub-plots about Flashman and Arnold. It also included scenes of bullying and corporal punishment which may have been too graphic for family viewing. "Clean-up TV" campaigner Mary Whitehouse claimed that the programme broke the BBC's guidelines on the depiction of sadistic violence.

The series was later shown on Masterpiece Theatre in the USA. Both the programme and Anthony Murphy's lead performance won Emmy Awards.

Cast
 Anthony Murphy as Tom Brown
 Iain Cuthbertson as Dr. Thomas Arnold
 Louise Jameson as Mary Arnold
 Simon Fisher Turner as Harry "Scud" East
 Richard Morant as Flashman
 Barry Stokes as Brooke
 Gerald Flood as Sir Richard Flashman
 Richard Gibson as Sunning
 Christopher Guard as Darcy
 Daniel Hill as Harry
 John Hug as Druce
 Robin Langford as Martin
 John Paul as Mr. Brown

References

External links 
 

1970s British drama television series
Television shows based on British novels
Primetime Emmy Award for Outstanding Miniseries winners
1971 British television series debuts